Muhajir culture is the culture of the various Muslims of different ethnicities who migrated mainly from North India (after the partition of British India and subsequent establishment of the Dominion of Pakistan) in 1947 generally to Karachi, the then federal capital of Pakistan. They consist of various ethnicities and linguistic groups. The Muhajirs are mainly concentrated in Karachi and Hyderabad.

History

Early history of the Muhajir community

The roots of Muhajirs lie with Muslim migration and settlement in various parts of especially modern Gujarat, East Punjab, Bihar, Rajesthan and Uttar Pradesh. The conversion of natives to Islam and the migration of Muslims from the Muslim World coalesced to form the Urdu Muslim community which was referred to as Hindustani Musalmans, East Punjab. Early settlement of Northern Muslims was due to the migrations and then establishment of Turkish Sultanate. In medieval times, the term Hindustani Musalman was applied to those Muslims who were either converts to Islam or whose ancestors migrated and settled in Delhi Sultanate. These Hindustani Musalmans did not form a single community, as they were divided by ethnic, linguistic and economic differences. Often these early settlers lived in fortified towns, known as Qasbahs. With the rise of the barbaric Mongols hordes under Genghis Khan which committed massacres and genocides in Central Asia and Middle East, there was an influx of Muslim refugees into the Delhi Sultanate, many of whom settled in the provincial qasbas, bringing with them an Arabo-Persianized culture. Many of these early settlers are the ancestors of the Sayyid and Shaikh communities. In these qasbas, over time a number of cultural norms arose, which still typify many North Indian Muslim traditions. The Turkish Sultans of Delhi and their Mughal successors patronized the émigré Muslim culture: Islamic jurists of the Sunni Hanafi school, Persian literati who were Shia Ithnā‘ashariyyah and Sufis of several orders, including the Chishti, Qadiri and Naqshbandi. These Sufi orders were particularly important in converting Hindus to Islam.

Since the time of the Muslim conquests, the eastern region of the Indus river has been referred to as Hind and later Hindustan. For example, the army of Ghiyas ud din Balban was referred to as "Hindustani" troops, who were attacked by the "Hindus". This was continued by the Mughal Empire, where Muslim Indians were referred to as Hindustanis, while non-Muslim Indians were referred to as Hindus.

Millions of natives converted to Islam during the Muslim rule. Lodi dynasty was dominated by the Pashtuns soldiers from Khyber Pakhtunkhwa and Afghanistan who settled in the northern India. After the Battle of Panipat (1526) Mughal Emperor Babur defeated the Lodi dynasty with Tajik, Chagatai and Uzbek soldiers and nobility. These Central Asian Turk soldiers and nobles were awarded estates and they settled with their families in the northern India. These diverse ethnic, cultural and linguistic groups merged over the centuries to the form Urdu speaking Muslims of South Asia.

The Barha Sayyid tribe of Indian Muslims of the Doab, due to their reputation for bravery, traditionally composed the vanguard of the Mughal imperial armies, to which they held the hereditary right in every battle. After the death of Aurangzeb, the Barhas became kingmakers in the Mughal empire under Qutub-ul-Mulk and Ihtisham-ul-Mulk, creating and deposing Mughal emperors at will. 

The Rohilla leader Daud Khan was awarded the Katehar (later called Rohilkhand) region in the then northern India by Mughal emperor Aurangzeb Alamgir (ruled 1658-1707) to suppress the Rajput uprisings, which had afflicted this region. Originally, some 20,000 soldiers from various Pashtun tribes (Yusafzai, Ghori, Ghilzai, Barech, Marwat, Durrani, Tareen, Kakar, Naghar, Afridi and Khattak) were hired by Mughals to provide soldiers to the Mughal armies. Their performance was appreciated by Mughal emperor Aurangzeb Alamgir, and an additional force of 25,000 Pashtuns were recruited from modern Khyber Pakhtunkhwa and Afghanistan and were given respected positions in Mughal Army. Nearly all of Pashtuns settled in the Katehar region and also brought their families from modern Khyber Pakhtunkhwa and Afghanistan. In 1739, a new wave of Pashtuns settled increasing their population to over 1,000,000. After the Third Battle of Panipat fought in 1761 between the Ahmad Shah Durrani and Maratha Empire thousands of Muslim Pashtun, Punjabi and Baloch soldiers settled in the northern India. These diverse ethnic, cultural and linguistic groups merged over the centuries to the form the Urdu speaking Muslims of South Asia.

It is estimated that about 35% of Urdu speakers are of Pashtun origin. The provinces such as Uttar Pradesh and Bihar had significant population of Pashtuns. These Pashtuns over the years lost their language Pashto and culture and adopted Urdu as their first language. Sub-groups also includes the Hyderabadi Muslims, Memon Muslims, Bihari Muslims etc. who keep many of their unique cultural traditions. Muslims from what are now the states of Delhi, Bihar and Uttar Pradesh.

Later history of Muhajir community 
When the Mughal Empire disintegrated, their territory remained confined to the Doab region of and Delhi. Other areas of today's Northern India (Uttar Pradesh or U.P.) were now ruled by different rulers: Oudh was ruled by the Shia Nawabs of Oudh, Rohilkhand by the Rohillas, Bundelkhand by the Marathas and Benaras by its own king, while Nepal controlled Kumaon-Garhwal as a part of Greater Nepal. The state's capital city of Lucknow was established by the Muslim Nawabs of Oudh in the 18th century. It became an important centre of Muslim culture, and the centre for the development of Urdu literature.

By the early 19th Century, the British had established their control over what is now Uttar Pradesh. This led to an end of almost eight centuries of Muslim rule over Uttar Pradesh. The British rulers created a class of feudal landowners who were generally referred to as zamindars, and in Awadh as taluqdars. Many of these large landowners provided patronage to the arts, and funded many of the early Muslim educational institutions. A major educational institution was the Aligarh Muslim University, which gave its name to the Aligarh movement. Under the guidance of Sir Sayyid Ahmed Khan, the Urdu speaking Muslim elite sought to retain their position of political and administrative importance by reconciling their Mughal and Islamic culture with English education. A somewhat different educational movement was led by the Ulema of Deoband, who founded a religious school or Dar-ul-Uloom designed to revitalize Islamic learning. The aim of the Deobandis, as the movement became known as was to purge the Muslims of all strata of traditions and customs that were claimed to be Hindu.

The role of Urdu language played an important role in the development of Muslim self-consciousness in the early twentieth century. Urdu speaking Muslims set up Anjumans or associations for the protection and promotion of Urdu. These early Muslim associations formed the nucleus of the All India Muslim League in Dhaka in 1905. Many of the leaders belonged to the Ashraf category. Urdu speaking Muslims formed the core of the movement for a separate Muslim state, later known as Pakistan. The eventual effect of this movement led to the Pakistan Movement, and independence of Pakistan. This led to an exodus of many Muslim professionals to Pakistan, and the division of the Urdu speaking Muslims, with the formation of the Muhajir ethnic group of Pakistan. The role of the Aligarh Muslim University was extremely important in the creation of Pakistan.

Modern history of the Muhajir community
The independence of Pakistan in 1947 saw the settlement of Muslim from India especially from the part of Punjab that became a state of India following the end of the British Raj. The Muslim migrants left behind all their land and properties in India when they migrated and some were partly compensated by properties left by Hindus that fled from Pakistan to India to escape the communal violence. The Muslim Bengalis, Gujaratis, Konkanis, Hyderabadis, Marathis, Rajasthanis and Biharis fled India and settled in Karachi. There is also a sizable community of Malayali Muslims in Karachi (the Mappila), originally from Kerala in South India. There is also a sizable community of people of Tamil Muslim heritage. The non-Urdu speaking Muslim refugees from India now speak the Urdu language and have assimilated into the wider community of Muhajirs.

See also 
 Muhajir people

References